The men's shot put event at the 1983 Pan American Games was held in Caracas, Venezuela on 23 August.

Results

References

Athletics at the 1983 Pan American Games
1983